Ghanem bin Shaheen bin Ghanem Al Ghanim is the Qatari Minister of Endowments and Islamic Affairs. He was appointed as Minister on 19 October 2021.

Education 
Al Ghanim holds a degree from the Royal Military Academy Sandhurst and a Bachelor in Aeronautics (1978). He is a fellow of the Pakistani Air War College.

References 

Living people
21st-century Qatari politicians
Government ministers of Qatar
Graduates of the Royal Military Academy Sandhurst
Qatari politicians
Year of birth missing (living people)